Unwilling Emigrants is a book by Alexandra Hasluck.  It is both a general study of Western Australia's convict era, and a biography of a particular convict, William Sykes. First published in 1959 by Oxford University Press in Melbourne, it was for many years the only published history of the era. It was republished in 1991 by Fremantle Arts Centre Press.
It was one of eleven books that Hasluck wrote.
 
It also was produced in other formats.

Notes

References
 

1959 non-fiction books
Books about Western Australia
Convictism in Western Australia
Oxford University Press books